Kongolo Airport  is an airport serving the Lualaba River city of Kongolo, Democratic Republic of the Congo.

Airlines and destinations

Accidents and incidents
After experiencing engine trouble about ten minutes  after takeoff from Kongolo Airport on 26 August 2007, an Antonov An-32B  operated by the Great Lakes Business Company struck trees and crashed  short of the runway while attempting to return to the airport, killing 14 of the 15 people on board.

See also
 Transport in the Democratic Republic of the Congo
 List of airports in the Democratic Republic of the Congo

References

External links
OpenStreetMap - Kongolo
SkyVector - Kongolo Airport

Airports in Tanganyika Province